Ali Abbas (born 11 February 1988) is a Pakistani television and film actor.

Personal life
His father is Waseem Abbas.

Early life and career
After graduating in law and working in a law office, Abbas changed careers to become a television producer before he moved into the family tradition of acting. His father, actor Waseem Abbas, strongly opposed his desire to become an actor, and he decided to work hard on it (losing a lot of weight for his characters), while trying to not capitalize on his name.

Television

References 

21st-century Pakistani male actors
Pakistani male television actors
Punjabi people
Living people
Male actors from Karachi
1984 births